Santhosh P. Jayakumar is an Indian film director who works in Tamil and Telugu-language films.

Career 
Santhosh made his directorial debut with Gaddam Gang, the Telugu remake of the Tamil film Soodhu Kavvum (2013). He made his Tamil debut with Hara Hara Mahadevaki (2017) starring Gautham Karthik. Santhosh Jayakumar directed the privacy art Iruttu Araiyil Murattu Kuththu (2018) with Gautham Karthik again. The success of the film prompted him to direct the Telugu remake Chikati Gadilo Chithakotudu (2019) and begin production on a sequel titled Irandam Kuththu starring himself. In 2018, he briefly began working on a film titled Theemai Dhaan Vellum with Gautham Karthik, but the film was later dropped.

His upcoming film includes a thriller Pulanaivu with Arvind Swami.

Personal life
Santhosh was born on 21st November 1988 in chennai.

Filmography 

As director

As actor

References

External links 

Indian film directors
Tamil film directors
Telugu film directors
Tamil-language film directors
Year of birth missing (living people)
Living people